Antonio Valero Osma (born 25 August 1955) is a Spanish actor.

Career
He began his career as actor in the theater in Catalan with the directors Fabia Puigserver, Albert Boadella and Pere Planella.<ref name = "Torres 473">Torres,  Diccionario del cine Espanol,  p. 473</ref> He made his film debut with La Mitad del Cielo (1986) directed by Manuel Gutierrez Aragon. Among his film are: Adios pequena (1986) by Imanol Uribe; El Lute: camina o revienta  (1987), by Vicente Aranda; El Juego mas Divertido  (1987) by Emilio Martinez Lazaro: Despues del Sueño (1992), by Mario Camus and Intruso (1993) by Vicente Aranda.  He appeared in TVE in  La forja de un rebelde  (The Forging of a Rebel) (1990), directed by Mario Camus, where he had the starring role as the alter ego of Arturo Barea, author of the  novel.

Selected filmography 
Mallorca Files episode 6 2021
 Pasaje al amanecer (2017)
 Aunque estés lejos (2003)
 Lista de Espera (2000)
 Intruso (1993)
 El Lute: camina o revienta(1986)
 Adios Pequena (1986)
 Half of Heaven (1986)

Notes 

 References 
 Torres, Augusto, Diccionario del cine Español'', Espasa Calpe, 1994.

External links

1955 births
Living people
People from Burjassot
Spanish male stage actors
Male actors from the Valencian Community
Spanish male film actors
20th-century Spanish male actors